Joseph A. Short was an American  football coach.  He served as the eighth head football coach at Colgate University. He held that position for the 1900 season.  His record at Colgate was 2–8.

Head coaching record

References

Year of birth missing
Year of death missing
Colgate Raiders football coaches